Vuyyuru revenue division is an administrative division in the Krishna district of the Indian state of Andhra Pradesh. Formed on 4 April 2022 as part of a reorganisation of districts in the state, it is one of the 3 revenue divisions in the district with 7 mandals under its administration.

Administration 
Vuyyuru revenue division consists of 7 mandals which are Kankipadu, Movva, Pamidimukkala, Penamaluru, Thotlavalluru, Pamarru and Vuyyuru.

References 

Revenue divisions in Krishna district